Lace webbed spider, lace-webbed spider or lace-web spider may refer to:

 Amaurobius fenestralis, a species of spider found from Europe to Central Asia
 Amaurobius similis, a species of spider widespread in the Northern Hemisphere
 spiders of the family Desidae, otherwise known as intertidal spiders

Set index articles on spiders